Damian Pawłowski (born 27 January 1999) is a Polish professional footballer who plays as a midfielder for Pogoń Grodzisk Mazowiecki, on loan from Zagłębie Sosnowiec.

References

External links
 

1999 births
Sportspeople from Szczecin
Living people
Association football midfielders
Polish footballers
Poland youth international footballers
Pogoń Szczecin players
Wigry Suwałki players
Wisła Kraków players
Stal Mielec players
Zagłębie Sosnowiec players
Ekstraklasa players
I liga players
II liga players
III liga players